Leinster versus Ulster is the oldest fixture in Irish rugby, with the first ever interprovincial match taking place between the sides in 1875. As such, a healthy rivalry has developed between the two provincial rivals.

Both provinces combined to provide the squad for the Irish international representative side from the first international match in 1875 until the IRFU was formally founded in 1879, consisting of the formal founding of the Leinster and Ulster branches and the addition of a third provincial side, the Munster branch. Finally a Connacht branch was added in 1885 to complete representation for all four provinces of Ireland.

The Interprovincial Championship did not formally begin until the 1946–47 season. Since then, Leinster and Ulster have played in many high profile games, including League and European Cup finals, with Leinster getting the upper hand on the big occasions thus far.

Overall Summary of Games Since 1946

Statistics

Biggest wins

Leinster: 40–7 (33 points, 5 January 2019), 38–7 (31 points, 2017/18), 9–39 (30 points, 1980/81)

Ulster: 30–6 (24 points, 2015/16), 28-6 (22 points, 2003/04), 14–34 (10 points, 1998/99)

Highest scoring match

Leinster 54 - Ulster 42 (96 points, 20 December 2019)

Lowest scoring match

Leinster 0 - Ulster 0  (0 points, 1947/48)

Most consecutive wins

Leinster: 9 (1975/76 - 1983/84), 7 (2009/10 - 2011/12), 6 (2019/2020 - 2021/2022)

Ulster: 9 (1984/85 - 1992/93), 5 (1966/67 - 1970/71), 3 (1955/56 - 1957/58)

Highest attendance

81,774 (European Cup Final, Twickenham Stadium, May 2012)

Results

See also
 History of rugby union matches between Connacht and Ulster
 History of rugby union matches between Leinster and Munster
 History of rugby union matches between Leinster and Connacht
 History of rugby union matches between Munster and Ulster
 IRFU Interprovincial Championship

References

Leinster
Ulster
Rugby union rivalries in Ireland
United Rugby Championship